Historically, suicide terminology has been rife with issues of nomenclature, connotation, and outcomes, and terminology describing suicide has often been defined differently depending on the purpose of the definition (e.g., medical, legal, administrative). A lack of agreed-upon nomenclature and operational definitions has complicated understanding. In 2007, attempts were made to reach some consensus. There is also opposition to the phrase "to commit suicide" as implying negative moral judgment and association with criminal or sinful activity.

In 2020, research demonstrated that stigmatizing and other verbiage commonly used in regard to suicide, such as reporting or sharing the method of suicide leads to a 13% increase in the national suicide rate following highly publicized (celebrity) suicides as well as a 30% increase in suicides using the same method as the public figure.

Suicide-related ideations 

Suicidal ideation is any self-reported thoughts of engaging in suicide-related behavior. Subtypes of suicide-related ideations depend on the presence or absence of suicidal intent.

To have suicidal intent is to have suicide or deliberate self-killing as one's purpose. Intent refers to the aim, purpose, or goal of the behavior rather than the behavior itself. The term connotes a conscious desire or wish to leave or escape from life, and also connotes a resolve to act. This is contrasted with suicidal motivation, or the driving force behind ideation or intent, which need not be conscious.

With no suicidal intention 
Suicide-related ideation with no suicidal intention is when an individual has thoughts of engaging in suicide-related behavior but has no intention to do so.

With undetermined degree of suicidal intent 
When an individual is unable to clarify whether suicidal intent was present or not, the term undetermined degree of suicidal intent is used.

With some suicidal intent 
Suicide-related ideation with some suicidal intent is when an individual has thoughts of engaging in suicide-related behavior and possesses suicidal intent.

Suicide-related communications 

Suicide-related communications are any interpersonal act of imparting, conveying, or transmitting thoughts, wishes, desires, or intent for which there is evidence (either explicit or implicit) that the act of communication is not itself a self-inflicted behavior or self-injurious. This broad definition includes two subsets.

A suicide threat is any interpersonal action, verbal or nonverbal, without a direct self-injurious component, that a reasonable person would interpret as communicating or suggesting that suicidal behavior might occur in the near future.

A suicide plan is a proposed method of carrying out a design that will lead to a potentially self-injurious outcome; a systematic formulation of a program of action that has the potential for resulting in self-injury.

With No Suicidal Intent

Suicide Threat, Type I
Suicide Threat, Type I is a suicide threat with no associated suicidal intent. The threat may be verbal or nonverbal, passive or active.

Suicide Plan, Type I
Suicide Plan, Type I is the expression of a definite plan to end one's life but with no suicidal intent.

With Undetermined Degree of Suicide Intent

Suicide Threat, Type II
Suicide Threat,  Type II is a suicide threat with an undetermined level of suicidal intent. The threat may be verbal or nonverbal, passive or covert.

Suicide Plan, Type II
Suicide Plan, Type II is a proposed method of achieving a potentially self-injurious outcome with an undetermined level of intent.

With Some Degree of Suicidal Intent

Suicide Threat, Type III
Suicide Threat, Type III is a suicide threat with some degree of suicidal intent. The threat may be verbal or nonverbal, passive or covert.

Suicide Plan, Type III
Suicide Plan, Type III is a proposed method of achieving a potentially self-injurious outcome with some suicidal intent.

Suicide-related behaviors 

Suicide related behavior is a self-inflicted, potentially injurious behavior for which there is evidence (either explicit or implicit) either that: (a) the person wished to use the appearance of intending to kill themselves in order to attain some other end; or (b) the person intended at some undetermined or some known degree to kill themselves. Suicide-related behaviors can result in no injuries, injuries, or death. Suicide-related behaviors comprise self-harm, self-inflicted unintentional death, undetermined suicide-related behaviors, self-inflicted death with undetermined intent, suicide attempt, and suicide.

Self-harm is self-inflicted, potentially injurious behavior for which there is evidence (either implicit or explicit) that the person did not intend to kill himself/herself (i.e., had no intent to die). Persons engage in self-harm behaviors for its own sake (e.g., to use pain as a focusing stimulant, or due to a condition like trichotillomania), or when they wish to use the appearance of intending to kill themselves in order to attain some other end (e.g., to seek help, to punish themselves or others, to receive attention, or to regulate negative moods). Self-harm may result in no injuries, injuries, or death.

Suicidal gestures are suicide-related behaviors that are carried out without suicidal intent. It is considered a controversial term. These behaviors may be labeled as Self Harm, Type I (no injury) or Self-Harm, Type II (with injury), because the purpose of the behaviors is to alter one's life circumstances (interpersonal or intrapersonal) in a manner without suicidal intent but involving self-inflicted behaviors (whether or not it resulted in injuries). If there is an undetermined degree of suicidal intent, it is labeled as Undetermined Suicide-Related Behavior, Type I (no injury), or Undetermined Suicide-Related Behavior, Type II (with injury).

With No Suicidal Intent

Self-Harm, Type I
Self-Harm, Type I is self-harm that has not resulted in injury.

Self-Harm, Type II
Self-Harm, Type II is self-harm that has resulted in nonfatal injury.

Self-Inflicted Unintentional Death
Self-Inflicted Unintentional Death, often called accidental suicide, is self-harm that has resulted in death. It is defined as from self-inflicted injury, poisoning, or suffocation where there is evidence (either explicit or implicit) that there was no intent to die. This category includes those injuries or poisonings described as unintended or accidental.

With Undetermined Degree of Suicide Intent
Suicide-related Behavior With Undetermined Degree of Suicide Intent is self-inflicted, potentially injurious behavior where intent is unknown.

Undetermined Suicide-Related Behavior, Type I
Undetermined Suicide-Related Behavior, Type I is self-injurious behavior that has not resulted in injuries and for which the person is unable to admit positively to the intent to die or is reluctant to admit positively to the intent to die due to other psychological states.

Undetermined Suicide-Related Behavior, Type II
Undetermined Suicide-Related Behavior, Type II is self-injurious behavior that has resulted in injuries and for which the person is unable to admit positively to the intent to die or is reluctant to admit positively to the intent to die due to other psychological states.

Self-Inflicted Death with Undetermined Intent
Self-Inflicted Death with Undetermined Intent is self-injurious behavior that has resulted in fatal injury and for which intent is either equivocal or unknown.

With Some Degree of Suicidal Intent
A suicide attempt is defined as a self-inflicted, potentially injurious behavior with a nonfatal outcome for which there is evidence (either explicit or implicit) of intent to die. A suicide attempt may result in no injuries, injuries, or death.

Suicide Attempt, Type I
Suicide Attempt, Type I is a suicide attempt with some degree of suicidal intent and no resultant injuries, regardless of the degree of injury or lethality of method.

Suicide Attempt, Type II
Suicide Attempt, Type II is a suicide attempt with some degree of suicidal intent and resultant injuries.

Suicide
A suicide is a self-inflicted death with evidence (either explicit or implicit) of intent to die. The term completed suicide has also been used synonymously, but is generally believed to be redundant and potentially pejorative, and, as such, is not recommended. Example: "John’s death was a suicide." "John completed suicide."

Opposition to the term "commit" suicide

According to Fairbairn in his philosophical study of suicide published in 1995, "The most common way of speaking about suicide is to talk of its being 'committed'." An article published in 2011 stated that, although "committed suicide" or similar descriptions continued to be the norm in the English language, the phrase "committed" associates death by suicide, or more accurately, death by mental illness, with criminal or sinful actions. Research has pointed out that this phrasing has become so entrenched in English vocabulary that it has gained "a naturalness which implies a deceptive harmlessness." Per reportingonsuicide.org,Certain phrases and words can further stigmatize suicide, spread myths, and undermine suicide prevention objectives such as "committed suicide" or referring to suicide as "successful," "unsuccessful" or a "failed attempt." Instead use, "died by suicide" or "killed him/herself." While common, Lebacqz & Englehardt argue that referring to suicide as an act "committed" is hazardous to ethical clarity. Others have also argued in favour of alternative language regarding suicide, both in the interest of moral and ethical precision, as well as scientific and clinical clarity. A United States Navy report urges against the use of the term "committed suicide" on similar grounds, asserting that "suicide is better understood when framed objectively within the context of behavioral health."

The lack of clarity in English suicide terminology has been attributed to the connotations of crime, dishonour, and sin that suicide may carry. The German term Selbstmord begehen is similar, denoting an act of commission. Common language has been described as "[portraying] suicide as a 'crime' to be 'committed' as is, for example, murder." This is despite the fact that suicide is largely no longer a crime, and that, as noted suicidologist Samuel Wallace wrote, "all suicide is neither abhorrent nor not; insane or not; selfish or not; rational or not; justifiable or not."

Canadian suicide prevention activist, P. Bonny Ball, commented that the alleged criminal implications of suicide are a carryover from the Middle Ages when suicide was considered "both illegal and sinful by the laws and religions of the time." Sommer-Rotenberg had similarly argued that "the act of self-killing was considered criminal because it was perceived as transgressing the moral authority of God and the righteous feelings of humankind."

Since "committing suicide" was akin to committing murder or rape, it has been argued that they continue to be linked in some languages. However, this common English expression is not universal: "By contrast the French se suicider and the Italian uccidersi are reflexive. Likewise in Hebrew: l'hit'abbed, 'to self-destroy,' is something one does to oneself, with no implication of criminality" and translates in meaning most closesly to "suicided".

Various alternatives have been proposed to alter the language regarding the act of suicide from a variety of sectors – including government, journalism, community mental health advocates, and the scientific community. Terms such as "death by suicide"  have been suggested to be more objective. The World Health Organization has agreed that these terms "are more accurate and less open to misinterpretation."

As it applies to a direct clinical context, the widely cited Beck Classification of Suicidal Behaviour exclusively uses the terminology of "complete suicide". This classification was revisited in a number of notable documents (such as the Operational Classification for Determination of Suicide, the 'Tower of Babel' nomenclature, the WHO/EURO definitions, the Columbia University suicidality classification, the CDC self-directed violence surveillance system, and the Denver VA VISN 19 MIRECC self-directed violence classification system).

Advocacy groups have suggested a variety of guidelines for suicide terminology. As it concerns media reporting of suicide, a key indicator of guideline influence on language as it is practiced in that context reports including one by the Annenberg School for Communication's Public Policy Center at the University of Pennsylvania suggests that there is "evidence of a change in reporting practices following the release of the new media guidelines".

References 

terminology
Medical terminology